Samuel McCleary Scott (5 November 1873 – 1938) was a Scottish footballer who played in the Football League for Bolton Wanderers.

References

1873 births
1938 deaths
Scottish footballers
English Football League players
Association football defenders
Port Glasgow Athletic F.C. players
Bolton Wanderers F.C. players
Rangers F.C. players
Barrow A.F.C. players